Transgender rights in Brazil include the right to change one's legal name and sex without the need of surgery or professional evaluation, and the right to sex reassignment surgery provided by Brazil's public health service, the .

Gender recognition

History

Since 2009 
Changing legal gender assignment in Brazil is legal according to the Superior Court of Justice of Brazil, as stated in a decision rendered on 17 October 2009.

Unanimously, the 3rd Class of the Superior Court of Justice approved allowing the option of name and gender change on the birth certificate of a transgender person who has undergone sex reassignment surgery.

The understanding of the ministers was that it made no sense to allow people to have such surgery performed in the free federal health system and not allow them to change their name and gender in the civil registry.

The ministers followed the vote of the rapporteur, Nancy Andrighi, who argued that "if Brazil consents to the possibility of surgery, it should also provide the means for the individual to have a decent life in society". In the opinion of the rapporteur, preventing the record change for a transgender person who has gone through sex reassignment surgery could constitute a new form of social prejudice, and cause more psychological instability. She explained:

According to Minister  of the Superior Court of Justice, transgender people should have their social integration ensured with respect to their dignity, autonomy, intimacy and privacy, which must therefore incorporate their civil registry.

Since 2018 
The Supreme Federal Court ruled on 1 March 2018, that a transgender person has the right to change their official name and sex without the need of surgery or professional evaluation, just by self-declaration of their psychosocial identity.

Gender reassignment surgery 
In 2008, Brazil's public health system started providing free sex reassignment surgery in compliance with a court order. Federal prosecutors had argued that gender reassignment surgery was covered under a constitutional clause guaranteeing medical care as a basic right.

The Regional Federal Court agreed, saying in its ruling:

Patients must be at least 18 years old and diagnosed as transgender with no personality disorders, and must undergo psychological evaluation with a multidisciplinary team for at least two years, begins with 16 years old. The national average is of 100 surgeries per year, according to the Ministry of Health of Brazil.

See also

References 

LGBT law in Brazil
LGBT rights in Brazil
Brazil
Brazil
Brazil